Alfredo Wagner is a municipality in the state of Santa Catarina in the South region of Brazil.

The municipality contains the Rio das Furnas Private Natural Heritage Reserve, created in 2002.

The first attempts of colonizing Alfredo Wagner were made at nineteen military in the Morro do Trombudo. The expedition was unsuccessful because snow was abundant and the rain in the three years ravaged the region. Augusto Lima, in 1893, settled in Rivers Adaga and Caeté, accompanied by some settlers. The local passed the name "Barracão", the first name of "Alfredo Wagner". The name is a homage to the men of more worked for emancipation political-administrative the municipality, dismembering of Bom Retiro.

Prehistory

In the start of the 1990s, teachers of University Federal of Santa Catarina found the fossil of a dinosaur, who lived 220 million years ago.

Colonization

The colonization the Alfredo Wagner mainly is the German and Italian, with the presence of Tyrolean of Italian language.

See also
List of municipalities in Santa Catarina

References

Municipalities in Santa Catarina (state)